The International Society for Heart and Lung Transplantation (ISHLT), established in 1981, is a professional organization committed to research and education in heart and lung disease and transplantation. It holds annual scientific meetings and publishes The Journal of Heart and Lung Transplantation. It also holds the worlds largest registry of heart and lung transplant data.

Origin
The initial idea for the society came about at a meeting in November 1980 in Miami, Florida, during the annual meeting of the American Heart Association, and was led by Michael L. Hess. The International Society of Heart Transplantation had formed earlier in 1973. Other founding members include Edward Stinson, Andrea Hastillo, Jacques Losman, Mark Thompson, Jack Copeland, Sir Terence English, Stuart Jamieson and Michael Kaye. The first official meeting was held in 1981.

In 1981, cardiac transplantation pioneer Norman Shumway, became the lifetime honorary president and thereafter, the society widened its membership internationally and across specialities including pathology.

Registry
The ISHLT holds a record of over 120,000 heart transplants performed between 1967 and 2020.

ISHLT Awards

Philip K. Caves award
Since 1982, the ISHLT has awarded one of its highest awards in the name of surgeon Philip Caves, who pioneered the procedure of transvenous endomyocardial biopsy to assess for rejection following heart transplantation.

Lifetime achievement awards
The ISHLT lifetime achievement award is given to those whose lifetime work has "made a significant contribution toward improving the care of patients with advanced heart or lung disease" In its thirty eight year history, only seven have been awarded.

Norman Shumway received the first award in 1996.

Keith Reemtsma received the ISHLT Lifetime Achievement Award in 1999.

In 2012, Sharon Hunt, who has published more than 200 papers related to particularly organ rejection, post-operative care and bridge-to-transplant, was awarded the ISHLT Lifetime achievement award.

In 2014, the award was bestowed to Sir Terence English for "outstanding achievements and tireless dedication in the field of heart and lung transplantation". He served as a Cardiothoracic Surgeon to Papworth and Addenbrooke Hospital, between 1972 and 1995.

In 2018, the seventh ISHLT lifetime achievement award was presented to O. H. Frazier for his pioneering work in the treatment of severe heart failure, and in the development and innovation of heart transplantation and artificial devices.

Michael Hess received the award in 2021.

ISHLT lifetime service award
Kaye received this in 1996 and Losman in 1997.

ISHLT O.H. Frazier award
Since 2014, the ISHLT "O.H. Frazier Award", a grant in Mechanical Circulatory Systems Translational Research has been awarded, initially sponsored by HeartWare and later sponsored by Medtronic.

ISHLT pioneer award
The first 'pioneer award' was awarded to Vladimir Demikhov on 25 April 1989 in Munich, Germany, by Christian Cabrol. Twenty years later, in 2009, Cabrol received the 'pioneer award'.

ISHLT distinguished educator award
In 2014, the first distinguished educator award was awarded to James Kirklin.

Past presidents

1981–1990

1990–2001

2000–2011

2010 onwards

References

Further reading
English T. Chapter 2: the Genesis of ISHLT. In: Kirklin JK, Mehra M, West LJ, eds. ISHLT monograph series, Volume 4: The history of international heart and lung transplantation. Elsevier Publishers, Philadelphia, PA, pp 37-43.

External links
ISHLT history archives
The Journal of Heart and Lung Transplantation

Transplant organizations
Organizations established in 1981